Bonehead can refer to:

As a derogatory term:
 White power skinhead (used by punk rockers and Skinheads Against Racial Prejudice)

In arts and entertainment:
 Bonehead (band), a Philadelphia, Pennsylvania band
 Bone Head, a 1997 album by the band Half Japanese
 Bonehead, a BBC TV series starring Colin Douglas 
 Bonehead, a character in various comic films, such as The Bullshitters: Roll out the Gunbarrel
 “Boneheads", a short on Random! Cartoons

People:
 Bonehead Merkle (1888–1956), American baseball player
 Paul Arthurs, nicknamed Bonehead, former rhythm guitarist of the band Oasis

Other uses:
 Pachycephalosaurus or similar species